Light for the Lost Boy is a 2012 album by the American contemporary Christian music singer and songwriter Andrew Peterson, released on Centricity Music.

Background
Peterson worked with Cason Cooley and Ben Shive, in the production of this album. Centricity Music released the album on August 28, 2012.

Critical reception

Awarding the album four stars at CCM Magazine, Matt Conner states, "Light for the Lost Boy is sure throw long-time fans for an artistic loop." Jeremy V. Jones, giving the album four stars for Christianity Today, writes, "What's new is the brilliant edge to Light for the Lost Boy". Rating the album five stars from Worship Leader, Andrea Hunter says, "His use of space and arrangement to evoke myriad moods shines on Light for the Lost Boys mostly acoustic, gentle yet dramatic folk/rock." Andy Cooper, indicating in a perfect ten review by Cross Rhythms, describes, "Poetry and aural art, masterfully mixed."

Signaling in a five star review at New Release Today, Dawn Teresa replies, "The songwriting is superb...Lyrically deep, you'll discover nuances and meaning with each listen." Jen Rose, specifying in a five star review for Jesus Freak Hideout, recognizes, "As a lament to lost innocence and a celebration of new creation, Light for the Lost Boy is one of the year's best and bravest records yet." Giving the album a four and a half from The Phantom Tollbooth, Michael Dalton responds, "Light for the Lost Boy by Andrew Peterson is his boldest, most imaginative work."

Timothy Estabrooks, awarding the album four and a half stars at Jesus Freak Hideout, recognizes, "Andrew Peterson for making another beautiful album and continuing to be a bright light in the world of Christian music". Rating the album four stars for Indie Vision Music, Jonathan Andre describes, "with Light for the Lost Boy as the motivational spark to remember God's extension of His grace and my freedom in just resting in His presence!" Jono Davies, assigning a four star rating by Louder Than the Music, calls, Light for the Lost Boy a "heartfelt album".

Track listing

Chart performance
In 2013, the album charted on Sverigetopplistan, the official Swedish albums chart.

References

2012 albums
Centricity Music albums
Andrew Peterson (musician) albums